Mansa Central is a constituency of the National Assembly of Zambia. It covers the southern part of Mansa and a rural area to the south of the city in Mansa District of Luapula Province.

List of MPs

References

Constituencies of the National Assembly of Zambia
1964 establishments in Zambia
Constituencies established in 1964